Gisela Elsner (2 May 1937 – 13 May 1992) was a German writer. She won the Prix Formentor in 1964 for her novel Die Riesenzwerge (The Giant Dwarfs).

Early life
Elsner was born in Nuremberg, Middle Franconia. In 1959, she went to Vienna to study philosophy, Germanic letters and drama.

Career 
Elsner then lived as a freelance writer in various places: Lake Starnberg, Frankfurt, in Rome from 1963 to 1964, in London from 1964 to 1970, then in Paris, Hamburg, New York, and finally in Munich.

She was among the members of Group 47, which also included Günter Grass and Heinrich Böll.

In her 1970 novel Berührungsverbot (The Touch Ban or The Prohibition of Contact), several couples try to transcend the limits of the bourgeois sexual mores of their middle-class background by engaging in group sex orgies. In Switzerland, a journal that published excerpts from the novel was banned, and in Austria it was attacked as harmful to children.

Elsner described herself as a Leninist. She was a long lasting member of the German Communist Party.

Death and legacy

Elsner committed suicide by jumping out of a window, in Munich, on 13 May 1992.

A dramatized film about her life, No Place to Go, was made by her son Oskar Roehler.

References

Further reading 

 Christine Flitner: Frauen in der Literaturkritik. Elfriede Jelinek und Gisela Elsner im Feuilleton der Bundesrepublik Deutschland. (= Frauen in der Literaturgeschichte, Bd. 3) Pfaffenweiler 1995.
 Oskar Roehler: Die Unberührbare, Köln 2002
 Dorothe Cremer: „Ihre Gebärden sind riesig, ihre Äußerungen winzig“. Zu Gisela Elsners Die Riesenzwerge; Schreibweise und soziale Realität der Adenauerzeit. Herbolzheim: Centaurus Verlag, 2003.
 Martina Süess: Wenn Otto sich vertilgt. In: WOZ Die Wochenzeitung, 3. Juli 2008, Online-Version.
 Christine Künzel (Hrsg.): Die letzte Kommunistin. Texte zu Gisela Elsner. (= konkret texte 49) Hamburg: konkret Literatur Verlag, 2009. 

1937 births
1992 deaths
Writers from Nuremberg
German Communist Party politicians
20th-century German women writers
Suicides by jumping in Germany
1992 suicides